Typhoon Billie was an early August Category 4 typhoon that left 48 people dead and eight others missing (mostly at sea) and left $2.6 million (1976 USD, $8.9 million 2005 USD) in damage in Taiwan and eastern China after its 3449 km track across the far western Pacific.

Meteorological history

Interacting with a subtropical ridge to the north, the tropical depression turned sharply northeast and passed over Saipan before strengthening into Tropical Storm Billie.

Driven by a high pressure system and a trough, Billie then turned to the southwest and then westward and intensified into a typhoon on August 5. On August 7, Typhoon Billie underwent rapid intensification, reaching a maximum intensity of 140 mph (125 knots).

By August 12, the tropical cyclone had encountered wind shear which weakened the storm, before it made landfall on Taiwan as a Category 1 typhoon, and later on China China as a tropical storm. Billie degenerated into a remnant low soon after landfall. However, the system's remnants persisted for another couple of days, as they moved deeper into China, before dissipating on August 14.

Impact

Billie skirted the Ryūkyū Islands before making landfall in Taiwan and again in eastern China, producing huge waves that drowned 41 fishermen and swimmers along the coast of Japan.

Billie's second landfall was south of Taipei, Taiwan where a weather station reported  winds. Billie's impact in Taiwan was destructive as the storm sank three ships and damaged several others and killed seven people, leaving eight others missing, injured 24 and left $2.6 million (1976 USD, $8.9 million 2005 USD) in damage.

The third and final landfall was in eastern China as a tropical storm which brought  winds and heavy rain but there were no reports of deaths or damage reported. The name Billie was not retired after the 1976 Pacific typhoon season.

See also

 List of tropical cyclones
 Tropical cyclone

External links
 Typhoon Billie report
 Billie 1976 track
 Billie 1976 best track data

References

1976 Pacific typhoon season
Typhoons